Victor Bartley (born February 17, 1988) is a Canadian professional ice hockey defenceman who is currently playing with the Utah Grizzlies in the ECHL. Bartley has previously played for the Nashville Predators, Montreal Canadiens in the National Hockey League (NHL) and Swedish team Örebro HK, before moving to the Kontinental Hockey League (KHL) to appear with Kunlun Red Star.

Playing career
Bartley played major junior hockey in the Western Hockey League. As an undrafted free agent, Bartley started his first full professional season in the ECHL with the Utah Grizzlies before signing a one-year European contract with Rögle BK of the Swedish second tier HockeyAllsvenskan.  Bartley led all Rogle defenceman with 34 points in 52 games during the 2010–11 season and initially signed a contract with top league club, Djurgårdens IF before he was mutually released to earn his first NHL contract, signing a two-year deal with the Nashville Predators on May 24, 2011.

After attending the Predators 2011 training camp, Bartley was reassigned to AHL affiliate, the Milwaukee Admirals for the 2011–12 season. Bartley established his credentials with the Admirals to post 39 points in 76 games from the Blueline, finishing 10th in the American League.

During the lock-out shortened 2012–13 season, Bartley received his first NHL recall and made his NHL debut for the Predators in a 6–0 victory over the Edmonton Oilers on March 8, 2013.

Bartley was traded to the Arizona Coyotes on January 15, 2016, in exchange for fellow defenceman Stefan Elliott. Bartley was then immediately packaged with John Scott and sent to the Montreal Canadiens for Jarred Tinordi.

Having completed his contract with the Canadiens, Bartley left as a free agent to sign a one-year, two-way deal with the Minnesota Wild on July 1, 2016. Bartley missed the entirety of the following 2016–17 season with the Wild, after suffering an injury in the pre-season.

Unable to earn an extension to his deal with the Wild, Bartley left as a free agent without featuring for the club. With limited NHL interest, on September 15, 2017, Bartley returned to Sweden in securing a two-year contract with top flight club, Örebro HK of the Swedish Hockey League (SHL).

After a lone season with TH Unia Oświęcim of the Polska Hokej Liga (PHL), Bartley returned to former club, Kunlun Red Star of the KHL on July 23, 2021.

As a free agent and opting to return to North America, Bartley continued his professional career in the ECHL by agreeing to a second tenure with the Utah Grizzlies for the 2022–23 season.

Personal life
Bartley was born in Ottawa, Ontario and moved to Maple Ridge, British Columbia when he was five years old.

Career statistics

Regular season and playoffs

International

References

External links

1988 births
Living people
Bridgeport Sound Tigers players
Canadian expatriate ice hockey players in China
Canadian expatriate ice hockey players in Sweden
Canadian expatriate ice hockey players in the United States
Canadian ice hockey defencemen
Canadian sportspeople of Chinese descent
Ice hockey people from British Columbia
Ice hockey people from Ottawa
Kamloops Blazers players
HC Kunlun Red Star players
Milwaukee Admirals players
Montreal Canadiens players
Nashville Predators players
Örebro HK players
People from Maple Ridge, British Columbia
Providence Bruins players
Regina Pats players
Rögle BK players
St. John's IceCaps players
Undrafted National Hockey League players
TH Unia Oświęcim players
Utah Grizzlies (ECHL) players